This is a list of the Australian moth species of the family Uraniidae. It also acts as an index to the species articles and forms part of the full List of moths of Australia.

Epipleminae
Balantiucha cyclocrossa Turner, 1926
Balantiucha decorata (Warren, 1898)
Balantiucha leucocephala (Walker, 1863)
Balantiucha mutans (Butler, 1887)
Balantiucha seminigra (Warren, 1896)
Balantiucha stolida (Butler, 1886)
Cathetus euthysticha (Turner, 1911)
Chundana lugubris Walker, 1862
Dirades lugens (Warren, 1897)
Dysaethria pasteopa Turner, 1911
Dysrhombia longipennis Warren, 1896
Epiplema angulata Warren, 1896
Epiplema argillodes Turner, 1903
Epiplema coeruleotincta Warren, 1896
Epiplema conflictaria (Walker, 1861)
Epiplema desistaria (Walker, 1861)
Epiplema leucosema Turner, 1911
Epiplema quadristrigata (Walker, 1866)
Epiplema stereogramma (Turner, 1903)
Epiplema thiocosma Turner, 1911
Lobogethes interrupta Warren, 1896
Monobolodes subfalcata Warren, 1898
Rhombophylla xylinopis (Turner, 1903)

Uraniinae
Acropteris nanula (Warren, 1898)
Acropteris teriadata (Guenée, 1857)
Alcides metaurus (Hopffer, 1856)
Aploschema discata (Warren, 1899)
Cyphura geminia (Cramer, 1777)
Lyssa macleayi (Montrouzier, 1856)
Stesichora quadripunctata Warren, 1896
Strophidia directaria (Walker, 1866)
Urapteroides astheniata (Guenée, 1857)

External links 
Uraniidae at Australian Faunal Directory

Australia